Kostanay Central Stadium is a multi-purpose stadium in Kostanay, Kazakhstan.  It is currently used mostly for football matches and is the home stadium of FC Tobol.

History
The soccer arena has been in operation since 1964. The first match was played on May 11, 1967. In 2002   German technology was applied to renew the surface of the soccer field and an automatic irrigation system was installed. For electric lighting, the main arena was equipped with four special poles. In order to meet UEFA standards, the stadium was equipped with special lighting in 2008. Now the lamps have 1200 lux, instead of 200 lux. In 2017, the stadium was completely renovated. The capacity of the seats was increased from 8,320 to 9,500 and the east stand was completely rebuilt.

Features
The central stadium holds 9,500 people. The size of the playing field is 105x68 meters and is illuminated with 1200 lux. There are two grandstands; the west grandstand and the east grandstand.

The ticket price for the 1st level East and West grandstands is 300 KZT, while the price for the 2nd level West grandstand is 500 KZT.

References

External links
 3D view in FC Tobol website
QTVR fullscreen panorama of the Kostanay Central Stadium

Football venues in Kazakhstan
Multi-purpose stadiums in Kazakhstan